The 2011 Taça de Angola was the 30th edition of the Taça de Angola, the second most important and the top knock-out football club competition in Angola, following the Girabola. G.D. Interclube beat C.D. Primeiro de Agosto 5–3 in a penalty shoot-out after a 1–1 draw in regular time, to secure its third title.

The winner qualified to the 2012 CAF Confederation Cup.

Stadia and locations

Championship bracket

Round of 32

Round of 16

Quarter-finals

Semi-finals

Final

See also
 2011 Girabola
 2012 Angola Super Cup
 2012 CAF Confederation Cup
 Interclube players
 Primeiro de Agosto players

References

External links
 Tournament profile at girabola.com
 Tournament profile at rsssf.com

Angola Cup
Taca de Angola
Taca de Angola